The Juína-Mirim River is a river of Mato Grosso state in western Brazil. It is a tributary of the Juruena River.

See also
List of rivers of Mato Grosso

References
Brazilian Ministry of Transport

Rivers of Mato Grosso